Whitehall is a city in Muskegon County in the U.S. state of Michigan. The population was 2,706 at the 2010 census. The city is located in the southwest corner of Whitehall Township. Montague is its neighbor.

It is located on White Lake (actually the mouth of the White River). Whitehall's recorded history began circa 1859 when Charles Mears, a noted lumber baron to the area, platted the village along with Giles B. Slocum, naming it Mears. The population continued to grow due to its strategic location for floating and distributing lumber.

In 1862, it was renamed Whitehall and incorporated as the Village of Whitehall in 1867. It later was incorporated as a city in 1942.

Geography
White Lake is now connected to Lake Michigan by a dredged canal.

White River runs between the cities of Whitehall and Montague. The White River is nearly twenty-four miles in length and passes through White Lake before emptying into Lake Michigan. In 1675, Father Pere Marquette stopped in the area and learned that the Native Americans called the stream “Wabish-Sippe,” meaning the river with white clay in the water, which gave rise to the names of White River and White Lake.

Major highways

 is a business loop through the downtowns of both Whitehall and Montague.

Demographics

2010 census
As of the census of 2010, there were 2,706 people, 1,153 households, and 678 families living in the city. The racial makeup of the city was 95.0% White, 1.4% African American, 0.6% Native American, 0.5% Asian, 0.1% Pacific Islander, 0.5% from other races, and 2.0% from two or more races. Hispanic or Latino of any race were 2.7% of the population.

There were 1,153 households, of which 29.3% had children under the age of 18 living with them, 41.4% were married couples living together, 13.1% had a female householder with no husband present, 4.3% had a male householder with no wife present, and 41.2% were non-families. 35.8% of all households were made up of individuals, and 15.3% had someone living alone who was 65 years of age or older. The average household size was 2.22 and the average family size was 2.89.

The median age in the city was 42.9 years. 22.7% of residents were under the age of 18; 6.9% were between the ages of 18 and 24; 22.9% were from 25 to 44; 26.6% were from 45 to 64; and 20.8% were 65 years of age or older. The gender makeup of the city was 45.8% male and 54.2% female.

2000 census
As of the census of 2000, there were 2,884 people, 1,165 households, and 739 families living in the city. The racial makeup of the city was 96.60% White, 0.76% African American, 1.14% Native American, 0.31% Asian, 0.69% from other races, and 0.49% from two or more races. Hispanic or Latino of any race were 2.08% of the population.

There were 1,165 households, out of which 31.5% had children under the age of 18 living with them, 46.4% were married couples living together, 12.5% had a female householder with no husband present, and 36.5% were non-families. 32.2% of all households were made up of individuals, and 16.1% had someone living alone who was 65 years of age or older. The average household size was 2.35 and the average family size was 2.97.

In the city, the population was spread out, with 24.7% under the age of 18, 8.1% from 18 to 24, 25.9% from 25 to 44, 21.8% from 45 to 64, and 19.6% who were 65 years of age or older. The median age was 40 years. For every 100 females, there were 85.1 males. For every 100 females age 18 and over, there were 81.2 males.

The median income for a household in the city was $37,641, and the median income for a family was $50,944. Males had a median income of $41,964 versus $18,615 for females. The per capita income for the city was $18,544. About 5.5% of families and 7.3% of the population were below the poverty line, including 9.2% of those under age 18 and 8.8% of those age 65 or over.

Culture and recreation

Music and fine arts

Whitehall is home to the Playhouse at White Lake. The 400-seat theater was built in 1916 to be a performance venue for the White Lake area. In 1973 the theater was in danger of demolition and was acquired and renovated by nearby Blue Lake Fine Arts Camp with the help of a local fund drive and the participation of Whitehall's largest employer at the time, Howmet Castings. Blue Lake had been putting out productions until they built their own on-site facility in 2006. The theater was then transferred to the city, which puts on a season of theater running through the summer. Community fund raising efforts to improve the playhouse and keep it running are ongoing.

The Arts Council of White Lake has a 30-year history of providing high quality artistic support to the White Lake Community.  They provide numerous opportunities for members of the community and surrounding areas to view, listen to, create, and learn from the arts. ACWL programs, scholarships and grants reach thousands of people  each year, and help build a spirited, giving, and global White Lake culture. ACWL also sponsors a local Summer Concert Series and Artisan Market the first Saturday of every month that the Farmer's Market is open.

Whitehall is also home to 3 Frank Lloyd Wright cottages and a house, built from 1897 to 1905.

White River Lighthouse was built in 1875 by Captain William Robinson and served the White Lake area until 1960, when it was deactivated by the U.S. Coast Guard. The brick lighthouse is now a museum and features exhibits about the area's history related to the shipping and logging industries.  On May 17, 1953, Mrs. Frances Johnson, the then-keeper of the lighthouse, was a contestant on the long-running TV panel show "What's My Line?".

Festivals
Fourth of July Parade from downtown Whitehall to downtown Montague.
White Lake Area Arts & Crafts Festival in Goodrich Park features more than 150 talented and creative artists, live entertainment, jump houses, and food-on Father's Day weekend 
Cruz'in: A parade and display of over 400 classic cars. Starts at Funnell Field in Whitehall and parades to downtown Montague, MI-Last Friday in July.
Taste of White Lake: Area business and food trucks come together at the Playhouse for a fun evening of food and drinks.
FetchFest: Beer tent and food vendors come together in local brewery, Fetch Brewing Company, back parking lot.
White Lake Chamber Music Festival: Features over 30 events during the 1st week of August. 
Christmas Parade from downtown Whitehall to downtown Montage-First Saturday of December.

Media

Radio
Whitehall is home to several radio stations.

FM

Notable people
 George Edward Hilt, founder of the nation's largest farm-store retailer
Nate McLouth, former professional baseball player and Gold Glove winner.
Adella M. Parker, suffragist, politician, lawyer, and educator
Ruth Thompson, first female state representative of Michigan, first female U.S. Representative from Michigan, first female on the U.S. House Judiciary Committee.
Ryan Van Bergen, played Defensive End for the University of Michigan, 2008-2011.

References

External links
City of Whitehall
White Lake Area Chamber of Commerce

Cities in Muskegon County, Michigan